The Minstrel Boy is a 1937 British musical film directed by Sidney Morgan and starring Fred Conyngham, Chili Bouchier and Lucille Lisle. It was made at the M.P. Studios in Elstree. Like many Butcher's Film Service productions of the era, it takes its title from a popular song "The Minstrel Boy".

Cast
 Fred Conyngham as Mike  
 Chili Bouchier as Dee Dawn  
 Lucille Lisle as Angela  
 Kenneth Buckley as Austin Ravensbourne  
 Basil Langton as Ed  
 Marjorie Chard as Lady Ravensbourne  
 Mabel Twemlow as Lady Pont  
 Grenville Darling as Pat  
 Xenia & Boyer as Themselves
 Ronald Waters  
 Pat Kavanagh

References

Bibliography
 Low, Rachael. Filmmaking in 1930s Britain. George Allen & Unwin, 1985.
 Wood, Linda. British Films, 1927-1939. British Film Institute, 1986.

External links

1937 films
British musical films
1937 musical films
Films shot at Station Road Studios, Elstree
Films directed by Sidney Morgan
British black-and-white films
Films scored by Percival Mackey
1930s English-language films
1930s British films